The 1960–61 Wake Forest Demon Deacons men's basketball team represented Wake Forest University.

Roster

Schedule and results

NCAA basketball tournament
East 
Wake Forest 97, St. Johns 74
Wake Forest 78, St. Bonaventure 73
St. Joseph’s, Pennsylvania 96, Wake Forest 86

Rankings

Awards and honors
 Len Chappell – ACC Player of the Year

Team players drafted into the NBA
No one from the Demon Deacons was selected in the 1961 NBA Draft.

References

Wake Forest Demon Deacons men's basketball seasons
Wake Forest
Wake Forest